The 1986 United States Senate election in South Dakota was held on November 4, 1986. Incumbent Republican U.S. Senator James Abdnor ran for re-election to a second term, but was defeated by Democrat Tom Daschle.

Republican primary

Candidates
 James Abdnor, incumbent U.S. Senator
 Bill Janklow, Governor of South Dakota

Results
Although Abdnor won the primary by a fairly comfortable margin, it hurt him badly. Daschle was uncontested for the Democratic nomination and therefore was able to focus on the general election early, while Abdnor had to fight a challenge from a popular incumbent governor. Many political analysts say this was one of the factors in Abdnor's general election loss.

General election

Candidates
 James Abdnor (R), incumbent U.S. Senator
 Tom Daschle (D), U.S. Representative

Results

See also 
 1986 United States Senate elections

References 

South Dakota
1986
United States Senate